The 1983 Atlanta Falcons season was the Falcons’ eighteenth season in the National Football League. The team looked to improve on its 5–4 1982 season and make the playoffs for the second consecutive season. However, the Falcons started out terribly, losing five of their first seven games. The Falcons would finish the season with a 7–9 record in their first season under head coach Dan Henning. This would ultimately prove the first of eight consecutive losing seasons for the Falcons.

Offseason

NFL Draft

Personnel

Staff

Roster

Regular season

Schedule

Standings

Awards and records

References 

 Falcons on Pro Football Reference
 Falcons on jt-sw.com

Atlanta Falcons
Atlanta Falcons seasons
Atlanta